Jevenjan (also Romanized as Jevenjān) is a village in Kenareh Rural District, in the Central District of Marvdasht County, Fars Province, Iran. At the 2006 census, its population was 160, in 46 families.

References 

Populated places in Marvdasht County